Aglaophenia is a genus of hydrozoans in the family Aglaopheniidae.

Species
The following species are classed in this genus:

 Aglaophenia acacia Allman, 1883
 Aglaophenia acanthocarpa Allman, 1876
 Aglaophenia amoyensis Hargitt, 1927
 Aglaophenia baggins Soto Àngel & Peña Cantero, 2017
 Aglaophenia bakeri Bale, 1919
 Aglaophenia bicornuta Nutting, 1900
 Aglaophenia billardi Bale, 1914
 Aglaophenia bilobidentata Stechow, 1908
 Aglaophenia brachiata (Lamarck, 1816)
 Aglaophenia calamus Allman, 1883
 Aglaophenia carinifera Bale, 1914
 Aglaophenia coarctata Allman, 1883
 Aglaophenia constricta Allman, 1877
 Aglaophenia ctenata (Totton, 1930)
 Aglaophenia cupressina Lamouroux, 1816
 Aglaophenia curvidens Fraser, 1937
 Aglaophenia dannevigi Bale, 1914
 Aglaophenia decumbens Bale, 1914
 Aglaophenia diegensis Torrey, 1904
 Aglaophenia difficilis Vervoort & Watson, 2003
 Aglaophenia digitulus Vervoort & Watson, 2003
 Aglaophenia dispar Fraser, 1948
 Aglaophenia divaricata (Busk, 1852)
 Aglaophenia diversidentata Fraser, 1948
 Aglaophenia dubia Nutting, 1900
 Aglaophenia elongata Meneghini, 1845
 Aglaophenia epizoica Fraser, 1948
 Aglaophenia fluxa Fraser, 1948
 Aglaophenia galatheae Kramp, 1956
 Aglaophenia harpago Schenck, 1965
 Aglaophenia holubi Leloup, 1934
 Aglaophenia hystrix Vervoort & Watson, 2003
 Aglaophenia inconspicua Torrey, 1902
 Aglaophenia indica Stechow, 1921
 Aglaophenia insignis Fewkes, 1881
 Aglaophenia integriseptata Fraser, 1948
 Aglaophenia kirchenpaueri (Heller, 1868)
 Aglaophenia latecarinata Allman, 1877
 Aglaophenia lateseptata Fraser, 1948
 Aglaophenia latirostris Nutting, 1900
 Aglaophenia laxa Allman, 1876
 Aglaophenia longicarpa Fraser, 1938
 Aglaophenia lophocarpa Allman, 1877
 Aglaophenia meganema Fraser, 1937
 Aglaophenia octocarpa Nutting, 1900
 Aglaophenia octodonta Heller, 1868
 Aglaophenia parvula Bale, 1882
 Aglaophenia phyllocarpa Bale, 1888
 Aglaophenia picardi Svoboda, 1979
 Aglaophenia pinguis Fraser, 1938
 Aglaophenia pluma (Linnaeus, 1758)
 Aglaophenia plumosa Bale, 1882
 Aglaophenia postdentata Billard, 1913
 Aglaophenia praecisa Fraser, 1938
 Aglaophenia prominens Fraser, 1938
 Aglaophenia propingua Fraser, 1938
 Aglaophenia pseudoplumosa Watson, 1997
 Aglaophenia recherchia Watson, 2005
 Aglaophenia rhynchocarpa Allman, 1877
 Aglaophenia robusta Fewkes, 1881
 Aglaophenia septata Ritchie, 1909
 Aglaophenia sibogae Billard, 1913
 Aglaophenia sinuosa Bale, 1888
 Aglaophenia struthionides (Murray, 1860)
 Aglaophenia subspiralis Vervoort & Watson, 2003
 Aglaophenia suensonii Jäderholm, 1896
 Aglaophenia svobodai Ansin Agis, Ramil & Vervoort, 2001
 Aglaophenia tasmanica Bale, 1914
 Aglaophenia transitionis Fraser, 1943
 Aglaophenia trifida Agassiz, 1862
 Aglaophenia triplex Fraser, 1948
 Aglaophenia triramosa Nutting, 1927
 Aglaophenia tubiformis Marktanner-Turneretscher, 1890
 Aglaophenia tubulifera (Hincks, 1861)
 Aglaophenia venusta Fraser, 1948
 Aglaophenia whiteleggei Bale, 1888

References

Aglaopheniidae
Hydrozoan genera